Andrea Damiani (born 12 February 1985) is a French footballer who currently plays as a defender for Championnat de France amateur club Valence. He started his career in the youth team at Olympique Lyonnais, where he made several appearances for the reserve team. He then had spells in the French lower leagues with Lyon Duchère and Le Pontet, before moving to Singapore to sign for Étoile FC in 2010. Damiani went on to play 35 league matches for Etoile in two seasons with the club. He joined Valence on 29 June 2012 as the side's ninth signing of the summer transfer window.

References
General

Andrea Damiani profile at foot-national.com
Specific

Living people
1985 births
French footballers
Association football defenders
Olympique Lyonnais players
Lyon La Duchère players
Expatriate footballers in Singapore
US Pontet Grand Avignon 84 players
Étoile FC players